Voltage-dependent calcium channel subunit alpha-2/delta-1 is a protein that in humans is encoded by the CACNA2D1 gene.

This gene encodes a member of the alpha-2/delta subunit family, a protein in the voltage-dependent calcium channel complex. Calcium channels mediate the influx of calcium ions into the cell upon membrane polarization and consist of a complex of alpha-1, alpha-2/delta, beta, and gamma subunits in a 1:1:1:1 ratio. Research on a highly similar protein in rabbit suggests the protein described in this record is cleaved into alpha-2 and delta subunits. Alternate transcriptional splice variants of this gene have been observed, but have not been thoroughly characterized.

Gabapentinoids
alpha2/delta proteins are believed to be the molecular target of the gabapentinoids gabapentin and pregabalin, which are used to treat epilepsy and neuropathic pain.

See also
 Voltage-dependent calcium channel

References

Further reading

External links 
 
 

Ion channels